The Wrestling competition at the 2006 Central American and Caribbean Games was held in Cartagena, Colombia.

Medal summary

Men's events

Women's events

References

External links

2006 Central American and Caribbean Games
2006 in sport wrestling
Wrestling at the Central American and Caribbean Games